"Protège-moi" is a single by English alternative rock band Placebo, which was released in France only, on 8 April 2004. It was featured on their 2004 greatest hits album Once More with Feeling: Singles 1996–2004.

Content 

The song is a French language version of "Protect Me from What I Want" from their fourth album, Sleeping with Ghosts. The chorus remains in English, although the French title is sung in the background. It has been translated to French by Virginie Despentes.

Music video

The original music video for "Protège-moi", directed by Gaspar Noé, was never officially released as it was too sexually explicit to be shown, featuring uncensored nudity, heavy petting, fellatio, and cunnilingus. The video eventually put out for the song is an extract from the Soulmates Never Die (Live in Paris 2003) DVD.

Track listing
 "Protège-moi" – 3:14
 "This Picture" – 3:36

References

External links
 

2003 singles
Placebo (band) songs
French-language songs
Songs written by Brian Molko
Franglais songs
Rock ballads
2003 songs
Song recordings produced by Jim Abbiss
Virgin Records singles